The Chittoor Urban Development Authority (abbreviated: CHUDA) is an urban planning agency in Chittoor district of the Indian state of Andhra Pradesh. It was constituted on 12 February 2019, under Andhra Pradesh Metropolitan Region and Urban Development Authorities Act, 2016 with the headquarters located at Chittoor.

Jurisdiction   
It covers 434 villages in 22 mandals of Chittoor. The below table lists the urban areas of CHUDA.

References 

Chittoor district
Urban development authorities of Andhra Pradesh
State urban development authorities of India